EG Group is a British retailer headquartered in Blackburn, United Kingdom, which operates filling stations, convenience stores and fast-food restaurants in Europe, the United States and Australia. The group was created through the combination of Euro Garages and EFR Group in November 2016. It remains one of the largest privately owned businesses in the United Kingdom.

History 
Euro Garages was co founded by brothers Mohsin and Zuber Issa in 2001, who expanded the business from a single site (at a cost of £150,000) in Bury, Greater Manchester to circa 340 sites in the UK. The growth co-incided with oil companies selling off their consumer petrol station assets to focus on their core production and refining business. In October 2015, the private equity firm TDR Capital acquired a stake in the company. 

The Dutch-headquartered European Forecourt Retail Group was founded in 2007 as the European energy retail and marketing arm of the Israeli firm Delek, and was also acquired by TDR Capital in August 2014. In October 2016 Euro acquired EFR to form the Intervias Group, later renamed the EG Group. As a consequence of these transactions, TDR Capital now owns 50% of the enlarged group, with Zuber Issa owning 25% and Mohsin Issa the remaining 25%.

EG Group's acquisitions have been largely funded by debt, with a net debt of over £7.3 billion at the end of 2019.

Major acquisitions

United Kingdom and Ireland 
In February 2017, EG Group purchased 78 UK properties from Kout Food Group, this including 70 Little Chef sites (some with attached Burger King and Subway franchises) and 8 standalone Burger King sites. EG Group would then transform the Little Chef sites into its franchise partners (such as Greggs and Starbucks) by October 2018. The group founded EG Diner as a temporary measure in January 2018, when its licence to use the Little Chef name expired, effectively ending the Little Chef brand after almost 60 years.

In early 2020, EG Group announced that they were opening 150 American Bakery outlets under a partnership with Cinnabon by 2025.

In March 2020, EG Group became KFC's largest franchisee in the UK through the acquisition of 145 KFC outlets in the UK and Ireland.

In October 2020, EG’s owners won a deal to buy the supermarket chain Asda from Walmart for £6.8 billion, bringing it back into British hands after more than 20 years. Questions were raised after its auditor, Deloitte, "suddenly quit" to be replaced by KPMG. However, the group indicated there were no auditing disagreements. This accquistiion would mean EG Group would work with Asda to create 'Asda on the Move'.

In May 2021, EG Group bought Leon Restaurants for a reported £100 million.

In October 2021, EG Group bought Cooplands, the UK's second-largest bakery operating mainly in North East England and Yorkshire.

Europe 
In November 2017, the business secured approximately 1,000 petrol stations from Esso in Germany, which were transferred and integrated into the existing EG network in October 2018.

In May 2022, EG Group bought 285 petrol stations in Southern Germany from OMV, which were partly supplied by refinery Burghausen. The price was 485 million Euro cash which equals 614 million Euro including pending lease obligations.

United States 
On 5 February 2018, EG Group announced that it would purchase nearly eight hundred Kroger convenience stores for $2.15 billion. Later that month, EG Group announced that it had completed the acquisition of circa 1,200 sites in Italy from Esso. In April 2018, EG Group completed the acquisition of a portfolio of 97 sites in the Netherlands to supplement is existing network in the country. In December 2018, EG completed its acquisition of 225 sites of Minit Mart from Travel Centers of America LLC for upwards of US$330m.

In July 2019, EG completed its acquisition of fifty four Fastrac branded sites in the United States, and announced a deal to acquire sixty nine sites operated by Certified Oil, also in the United States. On 31 July 2019, EG Group announced having entered a binding agreement to purchase Cumberland Farms.

In November 2020, EG Group entered into a binding agreement for the acquisition of 18 locations of Schrader Oil in Fort Collins, Colorado.

Australia 

On 9 November 2018, Australian retailer Woolworths announced to the Australian Securities Exchange it had entered into a binding agreement to sell its 540 fuel convenience sites to EG Group for 1.72bn.

Potential takeover
An April 2022 report in The Wall Street Journal reported that Circle K parent Alimentation Couche-Tard is in talks to buy EG Group. Should a deal go through, it would significantly boost Circle K's presence in several markets including Europe as well as giving it a location in every US state except Utah.

Operations

United States

In the United States, EG America has quickly become the fourth largest convenience store chain with its various brands following 7-Eleven's purchase of Speedway  with Circle K and Casey's occupying the other spots ahead of EG America. EG America has opted to keep the various brand names as opposed to uniting them under one brand, but has made efforts to unite them: for instance, all locations began to sell Cumberland Farms branded coffee products, while locations acquired after the initial purchase of Kroger's convenience store chain have slowly started adopting the abstract continental United States logo that was originally owned by Kroger. All have begun having a shared loyalty program.

Some EG America locations have begun offering franchised food concepts at their locations, such as Subway, Burger King, Sbarro, and Hunt Brothers Pizza, to compete better with chains that have long-established in-house food products, such as Sheetz, Wawa, Rutter's, QuickTrip, Casey's, and Buc-ee's.

References

2001 establishments in England
British companies established in 2001
Companies based in Blackburn
Filling stations in the United Kingdom
Filling stations
Multinational companies headquartered in England
Retail companies established in 2001
Retail companies of the United Kingdom